Cheri Lynn Beasley (born February 14, 1966) is an American attorney and jurist who served as the chief justice of the North Carolina Supreme Court from 2019 to 2020; she was appointed an associate justice in 2012. Beasley had previously served on the North Carolina Court of Appeals and as a district court judge in Cumberland County, North Carolina.

Beasley was the Democratic nominee in the 2022 United States Senate election in North Carolina. She lost to Republican nominee Ted Budd.

Education
Beasley earned a Bachelor of Arts in political science and economics at Douglass College of Rutgers University–New Brunswick in 1988 and a Juris Doctor from the University of Tennessee College of Law in 1991. She also earned a Master of Laws from Duke University School of Law in 2018.

Judicial career 
Beasley spent her first years after law school as an assistant public defender in Cumberland County, North Carolina. She was first appointed to the bench as a state district court judge by Governor Jim Hunt in 1999, and then elected in a 2002 election. She was reelected without opposition in 2006. She served as a Judge in District 12 (Cumberland County) until her election to the Court of Appeals.

Appellate court
In 2008, Beasley was elected to the North Carolina Court of Appeals, defeating incumbent Douglas McCullough by a 15-point margin. In that election, she became the first Black woman to win election to statewide office in North Carolina without first being appointed by a governor. In December 2012, after four years on the Court of Appeals, Beasley was appointed to the North Carolina Supreme Court by Governor Beverly Perdue, filling the vacancy created by Justice Patricia Timmons-Goodson's retirement. She was elected to a full eight-year term in 2014.

On February 12, 2019, Governor Roy Cooper appointed Beasley to the position of chief justice after Mark Martin retired, making her the first African-American woman to serve as chief justice of the North Carolina Supreme Court.

Beasley ran for a full term as chief justice in the 2020 election, losing by 401 votes to Associate Justice Paul Martin Newby. After leaving office, she joined McGuireWoods as a partner in the law firm's Raleigh office.

2022 U.S. Senate campaign

In February 2021, various media outlets reported that Beasley was considering running in the 2022 U.S. Senate election in North Carolina. The News & Observer reported in March 2021 that Beasley had decided to enter the race for the Senate seat being vacated by retiring Senator Richard Burr. She launched her campaign on April 27, 2021. On May 17, she won the Democratic primary election. She lost the general election to Republican nominee Ted Budd.

Personal life 
Beasley is married to Curtis Owens, a scientist. They have twin sons. In 2014, Beasley was the featured speaker at Saint Augustine's University's Lyceum Leadership Speaker Series. She was the commencement speaker to the 2018 class of University of Tennessee College of Law. Beasley was also the keynote speaker at Samford University’s Cumberland School of Law Black Law Students Association's 24th Annual Thurgood Marshall Symposium. In 2019, she was the undergraduate commencement speaker for nearly 900 graduates at Fayettesville State University and the commencement speaker for Elon University's School of Law.

See also 

 Joe Biden Supreme Court candidates
 List of African-American jurists
 List of female state supreme court justices
 List of justices of the North Carolina Supreme Court

References

External links

 Cheri Beasley for North Carolina campaign website
 

|-

|-

1966 births
21st-century American judges
21st-century American women judges
African-American judges
Chief Justices of the North Carolina Supreme Court
Living people
North Carolina Court of Appeals judges
North Carolina Democrats
Justices of the North Carolina Supreme Court
Rutgers University alumni
University of Tennessee College of Law alumni
Women chief justices of state supreme courts in the United States
Public defenders
21st-century African-American women
21st-century African-American people
20th-century African-American people
20th-century African-American women
Duke University School of Law alumni
Candidates in the 2022 United States Senate elections